Grace Dangmei  (born 5 February 1996) is an Indian women's international footballer who plays as a forward for Uzbek side Sevinch Karshi and the India women's national team. She was part of the team at the 2014 Asian Games and at the 2016 South Asian Games where she scored two goals against Sri Lanka. During the 2016 SAFF Women's Championship, she scored a goal in the first half of the final, helping India clinch its fourth consecutive title at the tournament.

Early life 
Grace Dangmei was born to Simon Dangmei and Rita Dangmei and belongs to Rongmei tribe from Dimdailong Village, Kangvai Sub-Division, Churachandpur District, Manipur.

Club career 
Dangmei played the inaugural edition of Indian Women's League with KRYPHSA and also spent another season with the club. She joined Sethu in 2019 for 3rd edition of IWL. During the 2018 Indian Women's League, she was awarded as Emerging Player Award. She scored a brace in her first match with Sethu FC against Manipur Police Sports Club on 6 May 2019, and won the 2018–19 IWL season.

She then joined Gokulam Kerala in 2021, and earned vice-captaincy. Later on July 15, 2021, the All India Football Federation (AIFF) nominated Gokulam Kerala to represent India in the AFC Women's Club Championship 2020–21 pilot tournament. She appeared in the matches of 2021 AFC Women's Club Championship and had a brilliant performance against FC Bunyodkor women's team of Uzbekistan on 14 November, which they won by 3–1. In that continental tournament, they achieved third place. In the 2021–22 season, her team Gokulam Kerala clinched the title and qualified for AFC Women's Club Championship.

On July 2, 2022, it was announced that Grace signed a professional contract abroad, with Uzbek Women's League side PFC Sevinch Karshi on a season-long deal. She helped her Uzbek team winning both the league and cup in calendar year, scoring 4 goals in 14 league matches.

International career 
Grace appeared with India U-19 in 2014.

She made her senior international debut at the AFC Qualifiers in 2013, and becomes regular member of women's national team. In the six years with the national team, she made 37 appearances and scored 14 goals. Later, at the 2019 South Asian Games, they clinched gold, defeating Nepal. Her brace against Indonesia at the 2020 AFC Women's Olympic Qualifier Round 2 match, gave her fame.

Grace represented India at the 2021 International Women's Football Tournament of Manaus, where they faced teams like Brazil, and Chile. She scored a goal against Venezuela on December 1, in their 2–1 defeat.

On 7 September 2022, at the SAFF Women's Championship in Nepal, she scored a goal against Pakistan in their 3–0 win.

Career statistics

International goals

Honours
India
 SAFF Women's Championship: 2016, 2019
 South Asian Games Gold medal: 2016, 2019

Sethu
Indian Women's League: 2018–19

Gokulam Kerala
Indian Women's League: 2021–22
AFC Women's Club Championship: third place 2021

Sevinch Karshi
Uzbekistan Women's League: 2022
Uzbekistan Women's Cup: 2022

KRYPHSA
Indian Women's League runner-up: 2019–20

Manipur
Senior Women's National Football Championship: 2013–14

Individual
AIFF Emerging Player of the Year: 2018−19
 Indian Women's League Emerging Player: 2017–18

See also
List of Indian football players in foreign leagues

References

External links 

 Grace Dangmei at AIFF
 
Grace Dangmei at Eurosport

1996 births
Living people
People from Churachandpur district
Indian women's footballers
India women's international footballers
India women's youth international footballers
Footballers from Manipur
Sportswomen from Manipur
Women's association football forwards
Footballers at the 2014 Asian Games
Asian Games competitors for India
21st-century Indian women
21st-century Indian people
Kryphsa F.C. Players
Sethu FC players
Gokulam Kerala FC Women players
Indian Women's League players
South Asian Games gold medalists for India
South Asian Games medalists in football
Indian expatriate women's footballers
Expatriate women's footballers in Uzbekistan